South Korea competed at the 2022 Winter Olympics in Beijing, China, from 4 to 20 February 2022.

On January 25, 2022, the Korean team of 63 athletes (34 men and 29 women) competing in 13 sports was announced. South Korea will not have any athletes in ice hockey or ski jumping.

On January 28, 2022 long track speed skater Kim Min-sun and short track speed skater Kwak Yoon-gy were named as the Korean flagbearers during the opening ceremony. Short track speed skater Kim A-lang later replaced Kim Min-sun as one of the flagbearers. Meanwhile short track speed skater Cha Min-kyu was the flagbearer during the closing ceremony.

Competitors
The following is the list of number of competitors participating at the Games per sport/discipline.

Medalists
The following South Korean competitors won medals at the games. In the by discipline sections below, medalists' names are bolded.

Alpine skiing

By meeting the basic qualification standards South Korea qualified one male and one female alpine skier.

Biathlon

South Korea qualified two male and one female biathletes.

Bobsleigh

South Korea qualified two sleds in each of the two man and four man events, along with one quota in the women's monobob. This means South Korea can enter 9 athletes (eight men and one woman).

Men

Women

Cross-country skiing

South Korea qualified two male and three female cross-country skiers.

Distance

Sprint

Curling

Summary

Women's tournament

South Korea qualified their women's team (five athletes), by finishing third in the 2021 Olympic Qualification Event. Team Kim Eun-jung qualified as South Korean representatives by winning the 2021 Korean Curling Championships, finishing the tournament with an unmatched 11–1 record.

Round robin
South Korea had a bye in draws 1, 5 and 9.

Draw 2
Thursday, 10 February, 20:05

Draw 3
Friday, 11 February, 14:05

Draw 4
Saturday, 12 February, 9:05

Draw 6
Sunday, 13 February, 14:05

Draw 7
Monday, 14 February, 9:05

Draw 8
Monday, 14 February, 20:05

Draw 10
Wednesday, 16 February, 9:05

Draw 11
Wednesday, 16 February, 20:05

Draw 12
Thursday, 17 February, 14:05

Figure skating

In the 2021 World Figure Skating Championships in Stockholm, Sweden, South Korea secured one quota in the men's and two quotas in the ladies competitions. A second men's quota was secured at the 2021 CS Nebelhorn Trophy.

Freestyle skiing

Freeski

Luge

South Korea qualified one sled in each event, and a spot in the mixed relay. This means South Korea can enter three men and one woman.

Mixed

Nordic combined

Skeleton

South Korea qualified three athletes in skeleton (two male and one female).

Snowboarding

Parallel

Freestyle

Short track speed skating

South Korea qualified in all three relays with the maximum of five athletes in both genders. South Korean officials alleged systemic bias in favor of China in the short track speed skating competitions after disqualifications of several leaders.

Men

Women

Mixed

LegendADV: Advanced due to being impeded by another skater; OR: Olympic record; PEN: Penalty; Q: Qualified; QA: Qualified to medal round; QB: Qualified to consolation round

Speed skating

South Korea qualified four men and six women.

Men

Women

Mass start

Team Pursuit

References

Nations at the 2022 Winter Olympics
2022
Winter Olympics